Nuevo León is a state in Northeast Mexico that is divided into 51 municipalities. According to the 2020 Mexican Census, it is the seventh most populated state with  inhabitants and the 13th largest by land area spanning .

Municipalities in Nuevo León are administratively autonomous of the state according to the 115th article of the 1917 Constitution of Mexico. Every three years, citizens elect a municipal president (Spanish: presidente municipal) by a plurality voting system who heads a concurrently elected municipal council (ayuntamiento) responsible for providing all the public services for their constituents. The municipal council consists of a variable number of trustees and councillors (regidores y síndicos). Municipalities are responsible for public services (such as water and sewerage), street lighting, public safety, traffic, and the maintenance of public parks, gardens and cemeteries. They may also assist the state and federal governments in education, emergency fire and medical services, environmental protection and maintenance of monuments and historical landmarks. Since 1984, they have had the power to collect property taxes and user fees, although more funds are obtained from the state and federal governments than from their own income.

Outside the Monterrey Metropolitan Area, the state is sparsely populated. The largest municipality by population is Monterrey, with 1,142,994 residents (19.75% of the state's total), while the smallest is Parás with 906 residents. The newest municipality is Melchor Ocampo, established in 1948.

Nuevo León has several distinctive municipalities: Pesquería was the fastest growing municipality in Mexico from 2010 to 2020; Hualahuises is one of the very few enclaves in Mexico, surrounded by Linares; and San Pedro Garza García has the best quality of living in Mexico and is considered among the most affluent municipalities in Latin America.

Municipalities

References

 
Nuevo Leon